Amul Roger Thapar (born April 29, 1969) is an American attorney and jurist serving as a United States circuit judge of the United States Court of Appeals for the Sixth Circuit. He is a former United States district judge of the United States District Court for the Eastern District of Kentucky and former United States Attorney for the Eastern District of Kentucky. He was also President Trump's first Court of Appeals appointment and Trump's second judicial appointment after Justice Neil Gorsuch. Thapar was discussed as a candidate for the Supreme Court of the United States.

Early life and education 
Amul Thapar was born in Troy, Michigan to a family who immigrated from India. He was raised in Toledo, Ohio, where his father, Raj Thapar, owns a heating and air-conditioning supply business. Thapar worked for his father's business driving the truck. His mother, Veena Bhalla, owned a restaurant. She sold her successful business after the September 11 attacks and chose to serve as a civilian clinical social worker assigned to assist veterans.

After graduating from high school in 1987, Thapar attended Boston College, graduating in 1991 with a Bachelor of Science degree. He attended Ohio State University's Moritz College of Law for one year, then transferred to the UC Berkeley School of Law, graduating in 1994 with a Juris Doctor degree.

Career

Private practice 
After law school, Thapar served as a law clerk to judge S. Arthur Spiegel of the U.S. District Court for the Southern District of Ohio from 1994 to 1996, and then to judge Nathaniel R. Jones of the Sixth Circuit from 1996 to 1997. He was an adjunct professor at the University of Cincinnati College of Law from 1995 to 1997 and from 2002 to 2006.

Thapar was then an attorney at the law firm of Williams & Connolly in Washington, D.C. from 1997 to 1999 where he volunteered to represent the Becket Fund for Religious Liberty pro bono. In addition to being a practicing trial attorney, Thapar was also a trial advocacy instructor at the Georgetown University Law Center from 1999 to 2000. He was an Assistant United States Attorney for the District of Columbia from 1999 to 2000. He was general counsel to Equalfooting.com from 2000 to 2001. He returned to private practice at the Squire, Sanders & Dempsey firm in Cincinnati, Ohio from 2001 to 2002 before entering a life of public service.

United States Attorney 
Thapar returned to the U.S. Attorney's Office as an Assistant United States Attorney for the Southern District of Ohio from 2002 to 2006. He was then nominated and confirmed to the position of United States Attorney for the Eastern District of Kentucky, where he served from 2006 to 2007.

While an Assistant U.S. Attorney, he was appointed to the Attorney General's Advisory Committee (AGAC) and chaired the AGAC's Controlled Substances and Asset Forfeiture subcommittee. He also served on its Terrorism and National Security subcommittee, Violent Crime subcommittee, and Child Exploitation working group.

Thapar also led the Southern Ohio Mortgage Fraud Task Force, which successfully prosecuted approximately 40 perpetrators of mortgage fraud. He led the successful investigation and prosecution of a conspiracy ring to provide illegal aliens with fraudulent driver's licenses.

Federal judicial service

Service as district court judge 
On May 24, 2007, President George W. Bush nominated Thapar to the United States District Court for the Eastern District of Kentucky seat vacated by judge Joseph Martin Hood. The American Bar Association rated Thapar Unanimously Well Qualified, with one committee member abstaining. Thapar was confirmed by the Senate on December 13, 2007. He received his commission on January 4, 2008. According to the Trump administration, that appointment made Thapar the first United States federal judge of South Asian descent. His service on the district court terminated on May 30, 2017, upon elevation to the United States Court of Appeals for the Sixth Circuit.

Thapar began his career "First in Ohio as a line prosecutor pursuing drug dealers, gang members, and terrorist financiers. Then in Kentucky as a U.S. attorney and a trial judge known for his work ethic, writing, and teaching: he covered 3 far-flung courthouses in his own district (Covington, London, and Pikeville), volunteered to hear additional cases in Texas and on the Sixth and Eleventh Circuits, wrote award–winning opinions, and lectured regularly at UVA, Vanderbilt, Yale, Harvard, and other top schools."

As a district court judge, Thapar heard cases in Covington, Kentucky outside of Cincinnati, as well as in London and Pikeville. While on the bench, Thapar has served as an adjunct professor at Vanderbilt University Law School, University of Virginia School of Law, and Northern Kentucky University. He has been an invited guest at Federalist Society programs.

Thapar is known for his folksy and engaging writing style that is meant to be understood by everyday people. In an opinion about amount in controversy requirements holding that the amount was "exactly one penny short of the jurisdictional minimum of the federal courts" (Freeland v. Liberty Mut. Fire Ins. Co., 632 F.3d 250, 252 (6th Cir. 2011)), Thapar wrote about the humble penny, which "tend[s] to sit at the bottom of change jars or vanish into the cracks between couch cushions." In another case, Thapar explained that if the owner of a bar "promised to pour [a] man a glass of Pappy Van Winkle" – a rare high-end bourbon – "but gave him a slug of Old Crow [a much lower-priced bourbon] instead, well, that would be fraud."

Notable cases as a district court judge 
In 2013, Thapar was assigned to a case in the United States District Court for the Eastern District of Tennessee due to the impending retirement of Judge Thomas Phillips from the Knoxville court. The case involved a high-profile break-in by peace protesters at the Y-12 National Security Complex's Highly Enriched Uranium Materials Facility in July 2012. The three protesters, aged 57 to 82, were convicted.

On May 10, 2013, Thapar cited the definition of the federal crime of terrorism to keep the protesters in jail until their sentencing on February 18, 2014. Thapar sentenced one of the defendants, 84-year-old nun Megan Rice, to 35 months in prison for breaking into the U.S. nuclear weapons complex and using blood to deface a bunker holding bomb-grade uranium, a demonstration that exposed serious security flaws; Rice had asked not to receive leniency and said she would be honored to receive a life sentence. The two other defendants were sentenced to more than five years in prison, in part because they had much longer criminal histories. The activists' attorneys asked the judge to sentence them to time they had already served, about nine months, because of their record of goodwill. Thapar said he was concerned they showed no remorse and he wanted the punishment to be a deterrent for other activists.

On appeal, the Sixth Circuit reversed the most serious convictions against the protesters and, in May 2015, ordered their immediate release from custody, noting that the protesters' sentencing guidelines now recommended substantially less time in custody than they had already served.

Court of appeals service 
On March 21, 2017, President Donald Trump nominated Thapar to the United States Court of Appeals for the Sixth Circuit. Thapar received a unanimous well qualified rating from the American Bar Association. On April 26, 2017, the United States Senate Committee on the Judiciary held a hearing on his nomination. On May 18, 2017, his nomination was reported to the floor of the Senate by an 11–8 vote with one Democrat not voting. On May 24, 2017, the United States Senate invoked cloture on his nomination by a 52–48 vote. On May 25, 2017, his nomination was confirmed by a 52–44 vote. He received his commission on the same day. Thapar became the second Indian American judge of United States courts of appeals.

The Lexington Herald-Leader reported when Thapar was nominated to the 6th Circuit that "lawyers across the political spectrum praised [him] as a highly intellectual, thoughtful and hard-working judge."

Thapar also speaks at law schools across the country on originalism, textualism, civility, and other topics. He teaches at the University of Virginia Law School on the judicial philosophies of Justices Scalia and Thomas.

In 2018, Thapar published a law review article about the role of judges. He criticized "pragmatic" judging and argued that judges should not be "politicians in robes."

Consideration for the Supreme Court 
Judge Thapar was first considered for the Supreme Court in 2016, when he was a Federal District Judge. He has been considered a front-runner for an open seat since then. Thapar was included in a list of individuals that Republican presidential candidate Donald Trump "would consider as potential replacements for Justice Scalia at the United States Supreme Court."

After the June 2018 announcement by sitting Justice Anthony Kennedy that he would retire from the court, Thapar remained on a Trump "short-list." Thapar was one of six judges interviewed by President Trump early in July while being considered to fill the Kennedy vacancy, which was ultimately filled by the appointment of Brett Kavanaugh.

Personal life 
Thapar married Kim Schulte, a Kentucky real estate agent, and converted to Catholicism. The couple reside in Covington, Kentucky with their three children.

Thapar engages in his community through volunteer work. At his confirmation hearing, Senator Mitch McConnell noted that Thapar had "founded a brand-new chapter of the well-respected Street Law program, which sends law school students into underprivileged high schools to teach the basic underpinnings of our legal system."

See also 
 List of Asian American jurists
 List of federal judges appointed by Donald Trump
 List of first minority male lawyers and judges in Kentucky
 List of first minority male lawyers and judges in the United States
 Donald Trump Supreme Court candidates

References

External links 
 
 
 Biography at University of Virginia School of Law
 Biography at Northern Kentucky (archived)
 United States Court of Appeals for the Sixth Circuit Official Website
 Knoxville News Sentinel article, 5/11/2013
 Questionnaire for Judicial Nominees for the United States Senate Committee on the Judiciary	
 Contributor profile from the Federalist Society

|-

|-

1969 births
Living people
20th-century American lawyers
21st-century American lawyers
21st-century American judges
American jurists of Indian descent
American Roman Catholics
Assistant United States Attorneys
Boston College alumni
Converts to Roman Catholicism from Hinduism
Federalist Society members
George W. Bush administration personnel
Georgetown University Law Center faculty
Judges of the United States Court of Appeals for the Sixth Circuit
Judges of the United States District Court for the Eastern District of Kentucky
Kentucky lawyers
People from Covington, Kentucky
People from Toledo, Ohio
United States Attorneys for the Eastern District of Kentucky
United States court of appeals judges appointed by Donald Trump
United States district court judges appointed by George W. Bush
University of California, Berkeley alumni
University of Cincinnati College of Law faculty
University of Virginia School of Law faculty
Williams & Connolly people
Asian conservatism in the United States